Stemonitidaceae is an family of slime molds in the order Stemonitidales. It was first circumscribed by Elias Magnus Fries in 1829.

Genera

Leptoderma
Macbrideola
Meriderma
Paradiachea
Stemonitis
Symphytocarpus

Genera previously included in Stemonitidaceae, now transferred to Amaurochaetaceae:
Amaurochaete
Brefeldia
Comatricha
Enerthenema
Stemonaria
Stemonitopsis
Paradiacheopsis

Genera previously included in Stemonitidaceae, now transferred to Lamprodermataceae:
Collaria Nann.-Bremek
Colloderma G. Lister
Diacheopsis Meyl.
Lamproderma Rostaf.

References

Myxogastria
Amoebozoa families